Kilmacud Crokes won the 2005 Dublin Senior Football Championship against Na Fianna. Kilmacud won by 1-12 to 0-9 against a Na Fianna side which came under new management with the loss of Paul Caffrey to the Dublin Senior Football Team.

References

External links
 Official Dublin Website
 Dublin on Hoganstand
 Dublin Club GAA
 Reservoir Dubs
 Dublin Teams

Dublin Senior Football Championship
Dublin Senior Football Championship